Wajeeh Qassim (17 February 1938 – 13 January 2022) was a Palestinian politician and diplomat. A member of Fatah, he served as the Palestinian National Authority Ambassador to Morocco from 1988 to 2005. He died in Rabat on 13 January 2022, at the age of 83.

References

1938 births
2022 deaths
Ambassadors of the State of Palestine to Morocco
Arab people in Mandatory Palestine
Fatah members
Palestinian diplomats
Palestinian politicians
People from Jenin Governorate